Route nationale 7  (RN7) is a primary highway in Madagascar running 980km from the capital Antananarivo to Tulear at the south-west coast of the country. It crosses the regions of Analamanga, Vakinankaratra, Amoron'i Mania, Haute Matsiatra, Ihorombe, and Atsimo-Andrefana.

This is one of the most important roads of the country and relatively well maintained.

Selected locations on route
(north to south)
Antananarivo
junction with RN43
Ambatolampy (69 km)
Antsirabe (170 km) - (junction with RN34 to Miandrivazo and Malaimbandy)
Ambositra - (junction with RN35 to Malaimbandy and Morondava)
Ambohimahasoa - (junction with RN25 to Mananjary)
Fianarantsoa (412 km) - (Ranomafana National Park)
Ambalavao (462 km) - (Andringitra National Park)
Anja Community Reserve
Zazafotsy (586 km)
Ihosy - (604 km) (junction with RN27 to Farafangana)
Ihosy - (junction with RN13 to Betroka and Tolanaro (Fort-Dauphin)
Caves of Andranomilitry - (10 km from Ihosy)
Ranohira - (697 km) - (Isalo National Park)
Ilakaka
Sakaraha - (793 km) (Zombitse-Vohibasia National Park)
Andranovory - (junction with RN10 to Ampanihy and Ambovombe)
Toliara (Tulear) (923 km)

Gallery

See also 
 List of roads in Madagascar 
 Transport in Madagascar

References 

Roads in Analamanga
Roads in Amoron'i Mania
Roads in Vakinankaratra
Roads in Haute Matsiatra
Roads in Ihorombe
Roads in Itasy Region
Roads in Atsimo-Andrefana
Roads in Madagascar